Tigasis is a Neotropical genus of grass skippers in the family Hesperiidae.

Species
Recognised species include:
 Tigasis arita (Schaus, 1902)
 Tigasis wellingi (Freeman, 1969)
 Tigasis zalates Godman, [1900]

References

Natural History Museum Lepidoptera genus database

Hesperiinae
Hesperiidae genera
Taxa named by Frederick DuCane Godman